Langer Mesomelic Dysplasia (LMD) is a rare congenital disorder characterised by an altered bone formation that causes a severe short and disproportionate stature.

Signs and symptoms
The disease is characterised by 

 severe shortening of long bones (the limb's proximal and median segments are affected)
 severely underdeveloped or complete absence of the ulna and fibula (severe hypoplasia or aplasia)
 a thickened and curved radius and tibia.

Furthermore, these anomalies can cause deformities of the hands and feet. Hypoplasia of the mandible can also be present.

Pathogenesis
The disease is at its core caused by genetics, by homozygous or compound heterozygous mutations or deletions of either the SHOX, SHOXY or PAR1-gene. These are inherited in a pseudosomal recessive manner.

Diagnosis
Diagnosis may be suspected on the basis of the clinical and radiologic findings, and can supported by molecular analysis of the SHOX, SHOXY and PAR1 genes. The disease may also be suspected through ultrasound during the second trimester of gestation.

Classification
LMD is part of the mesomelic and rhizomelic skeletal dysplasias, which are primary bone diseases where the person's short stature is due to a lack of complete bone development of the limb's long bones. LMD is related to the disease Léri–Weill dyschondrosteosis.

Treatment
There is no known cure for LMD. In selected patients, orthopaedic surgery may be helpful to try to gain some functionality of severely impaired joints.

Prognosis
Life expectancy is normal.

See also
 Osteochondrodysplasia

References

External links 

Congenital disorders